The 1994 FIBA Africa Under-18 Championship was the 9th FIBA Africa Under-18 Championship, played under the rules of FIBA, the world governing body for basketball, and the FIBA Africa thereof. The tournament took place in Yaoundé, Cameroon from July 18 to 25 1994.

Nigeria ended the round-robin tournament with a 6–0 unbeaten record to win their third title.

Both winner and runner-up qualified for the 1995 FIBA Under-19 World Championship.

Participating teams

Squads

Schedule

Final standings

Awards

See also
 1995 FIBA Africa Championship

External links
Official Website

References

1994 in African basketball
1994 in Cameroonian sport
FIBA Africa Under-18 Championship
Basketball in Cameroon